Ye Jiao (born 21 October 1994) is a Chinese field hockey player for the Chinese national team.

She participated at the 2018 Women's Hockey World Cup.

References

1994 births
Living people
Sportspeople from Chengdu
Chinese female field hockey players
Female field hockey goalkeepers
Field hockey players at the 2018 Asian Games
Asian Games bronze medalists for China
Asian Games medalists in field hockey
Medalists at the 2018 Asian Games